Randolph Stewart may refer to:
 Randolph Stewart, 13th Earl of Galloway (1928–2020)
 Randolph Stewart, 9th Earl of Galloway (1800–1873)
 Randolph Stewart, 12th Earl of Galloway (1892–1978) 
 Randolph Stewart, 11th Earl of Galloway (1836–1920) 
 Randy Stewart, American sports shooter